Peter Joseph Ross is a fictional character appearing in American comic books published by DC Comics.

Publication history
The character was created by Leo Dorfman and George Papp and first appeared in Superboy #86 (January 1961).

Fictional character biography

Silver Age

Pete was the childhood best friend of Clark Kent in Smallville. One night when they were camping together, Pete secretly saw Clark changing into Superboy to attend to an emergency. Pete kept his knowledge of the superhero's secret identity to himself, even avoiding revealing his discovery to Clark. Pete resolved to use this knowledge to help his friend, for example by creating a distraction to allow Clark to slip away from a dangerous situation without raising suspicion.

The Legion of Super-Heroes was aware of Pete's assistance to Clark and made him an honorary member during his teenage years. During the Legion's battle with Mordru, it was stated that Pete Ross's knowledge of Superboy's secret identity would one day end up saving Superman's life (explaining why the Legion allowed Pete to retain that knowledge). No subsequent Superboy or Superman story featuring Pete Ross, as a teenager or an adult, followed up on this detail.

As an adult, Pete became a widower with a son named Jonathan, who also learned the secret of Superman's secret identity. When Pete's son was kidnapped by an alien race, Pete revealed to Clark his knowledge of his friend's dual identity, imploring Superman's help. When Clark was unable to provide this help, Pete suffered a nervous breakdown and attempted to discredit his former friend. Pete resided in a mental institution until his son was eventually saved.

In Alan Moore's story Whatever Happened to the Man of Tomorrow, Pete was captured by Toyman and Prankster and tortured into revealing Superman's true identity before being killed and stuffed in a toychest for Superman to find. Eventually, Superman discovered they were being manipulated by Mister Mxyzptlk.

Pocket Universe
Following the Crisis on Infinite Earths limited series, mainstream DC continuity was altered, such that Superman no longer had a teenage career as Superboy. The Legion of Super-Heroes remained dependent on Superboy's existence as its primary inspiration. In an attempt to resolve the paradox, a Superman/Legion story was crafted, explaining that a version of the Silver Age Superboy (and all his supporting characters, including Pete Ross) inhabited a "pocket universe" created by the Time Trapper, and that the Trapper had protected this universe from being destroyed in the Crisis. Later, the villain tried to destroy the pocket universe Earth. Superboy saved his homeworld, but at the cost of his own life.

Following Superboy's disappearance from the pocket universe Earth, the Lex Luthor of that world is tricked into releasing Kryptonian criminals General Zod, Quex-Ul and Zaora from the Phantom Zone. They proceed to lay waste to the planet, eventually killing its entire population—including Pete Ross. Having been summoned from the regular universe by Luthor and Supergirl, Superman executes the genocidal killers using green kryptonite, and brings Supergirl (a protoplasmic duplicate of Lana Lang) with him back to his own Earth.

Modern Age
The modern version of Pete is a far more minor character in the Superman comics, who eventually married Lana Lang, with the two having a son, Clark Peter Ross, although the relationship is occasionally strained due to Lana's knowledge of Clark's secret and Pete feeling that he was fundamentally Lana's second choice. The two are presently divorced, even after briefly reuniting following the Ruin storyline. Pete was Vice-President of the United States under Lex Luthor and briefly served as President following Luthor's impeachment but quickly resigned.

In the modern comic book continuity, Pete was not initially aware of Clark's secret. Instead, the secret was known by the villainous Manchester Black, who informed then-President Luthor of the secret, only later to wipe his memory of it. Prior to losing the knowledge of Clark's secret, Lex informed Pete that his close friend Clark Kent is in fact Superman. While Pete initially refrained from telling Clark about his knowledge, he did eventually tell him in Adventures of Superman #641.

Recently, it appeared that Ross had become a villain named "Ruin", but it was later revealed that he had instead been kidnapped by the real Ruin, Professor Emil Hamilton. Hamilton also kidnapped Pete's wife and child. Superman defeated the insane Professor Hamilton, rescued Pete, Lana, and their child, and exonerated Pete of the charges against him.

Pete has returned to Smallville without Lana to raise their son. He was seen attending the funeral of Jonathan Kent.

During the "Blackest Night" storyline, Pete works at Smallville's general store.

The New 52
In 2011, "The New 52" rebooted the DC universe. Pete has only had minor appearances.

Other versions
 In the Amalgam Comics universe, Pete Ross is an identity taken on by the hero Spider-Boy, who uses a "matter transformer" to alter his appearance.
 He appears in Superman: Red Son, though his name is changed to Pyotr Roslov. In this story, he is an illegitimate son of Joseph Stalin and is head of the KGB. Unlike his main series counterpart, he harbours resentment and envy for Superman and his abilities. He executes the alternate versions of Thomas and Martha Wayne (in that world, anti-communist protesters), leading to Batman vowing to overthrow the Communist Party of the Soviet Union. It is also implied that he organised Stalin's poisoning, which then leads to Superman's ascension to the Presidency of the USSR. Later, seeking an opportunity to get rid of the now-President Superman, he allies with the Batman and the United States Government; the plan fails and he is lobotomized by Superman.

In other media

Television
 Pete Ross was shown in a brief, non-speaking cameo in part two of the three-part opening episode of the 1990s television cartoon Superman: The Animated Series, titled "The Last Son of Krypton". He was also mentioned in the comic book based on the series when Kara Kent is being raised as the adoptive daughter of the Kents. Ma Kent emails Clark to say it is a small world to see Kara become the classmate of Susan Ross, Pete Ross' little sister.
 Pete Ross appears in the first three seasons of the television series Smallville, and was portrayed by Sam Jones III. Along with Chloe Sullivan, he is one of Clark Kent's best friends. Pete hates the Luthors for what he sees as their theft of his family's creamed corn business, and resents Clark's relationship with Lex (and later relationship with Lex's father Lionel). Pete is the first person outside of the Kent family with whom Clark shares the secret of his powers (albeit to prevent Pete telling the general public about the discovery of his spaceship, which had been lost in a recent tornado before Pete discovered it in a field). Although Pete is usually supportive of Clark and keeps this secret, their friendship is tested when he occasionally gets into trouble and relies on Clark to resolve his difficulties. In addition, the character has something of an inferiority complex, believing he can never match up to Clark. The character was written out of the series at the end of the third season, when Pete is brutally interrogated about Clark by an FBI agent. To protect the both of them, he moves to Wichita to live with his mother, who has just accepted a federal judgeship. Pete returns in the seventh season episode "Hero" where he is working as a roadie for OneRepublic. Having temporarily gained Elastic Lad-like powers after chewing Stride gum imbued with Kryptonite, Pete saves Kara and aids Chloe from a manipulating Lex.

Film
 In All-Star Superman, Superman briefly mentions a good friend named Pete (presumably Pete Ross) while writing down his final journal entry.
 Pete Ross appears in the films set in the DC Extended Universe:
 Pete Ross appears in the 2013 film Man of Steel portrayed by Jack Foley as a child and Joseph Cranford portrayed him as an adult. Pete is initially a bully, who is first seen mocking and cussing at Clark Kent in a school bus. After the bus crashes and Clark saves the children, he becomes a friend of Clark. When Clark was bullied again by Kenny Braverman and ended up being forced to leave by Jonathan Kent, Pete helps him up. In the later future, he becomes the manager of an IHOP and is interviewed by Lois Lane on her search for Clark Kent. Later, the IHOP is half destroyed by the Kryptonians' battle as Pete witnesses Superman fighting Faora. It is presumed that he recognizes him as Clark.
 Cranford reprised his role in Batman v Superman: Dawn of Justice. After Superman's sacrifice during the fight against Doomsday, Pete Ross attended Superman's funeral. He was the one who told Martha in a deleted scene that the funeral was paid for by an anonymous donor.
 An alternate universe version of Pete Ross appears in Justice League: Gods and Monsters, voiced by Larry Cedar.

Video games
Pete Ross appears in DC Universe Online, voiced by Mike Smith. He appears as a supporting character for the heroes. In the "Smallville Alert", Pete Ross is among the citizens that got turned into one of the clones of Doomsday and the players have to regress him amongst the other citizens back to normal.

References

External links
 Pete Ross: Honorary Legionnaires - Hero History

DC Comics sidekicks
Superman characters
Fictional characters from Kansas
Fictional presidents of the United States
Fictional vice presidents of the United States
Fictional United States senators
Characters created by George Papp
Comics characters introduced in 1961